Christopher Völk (also spelled Voelk; born 15 September 1988 in Kempten) is a German judoka. He competed in the men's 73 kg event at the 2012 Summer Olympics and was eliminated by Nyam-Ochir Sainjargal in the second round.

References

External links
 
 
 

1988 births
Living people
German male judoka
Olympic judoka of Germany
Judoka at the 2012 Summer Olympics
People from Kempten im Allgäu
Sportspeople from Swabia (Bavaria)
European Games competitors for Germany
Judoka at the 2015 European Games
21st-century German people
20th-century German people